Hatice Nükhetseza Hanım ("rich parfume"; 2 January 1827 – 15 May 1850) was a consort of Sultan Abdulmejid I of the Ottoman Empire.

Life
Nükhetsezâ Hanım was born on 2 January 1827. She was the daughter of the Abkhazian nobleman Baras Hatuğ Bey and his wife, the Georgian Ferhune Hanim, and her real name was Hatice. She grew up at court under the tutelage of Bezmiâlem Sultan, mother of Abdülmecid I, where she take the name of Nükhetseza. She was an excellent singer and a good painter and player of piano. She married Abdulmejid on 21 October 1841, that he had fallen in love with her after hearing her sing, and was given the title of "Second Ikbal". In 1842 she give birth her first child, a daughter, Aliye Sultan, who died as newborn. In 1845, was given the title of "Senior Ikbal". A year after the marriage, on 5 June 1846, she gave birth to her second child, a son, Şehzade Ahmed in the Old Çırağan Palace. The prince, died the next day on 6 June 1846. In June 1846, the French Ambassador, François-Adolphe de Bourqueney, noted that, Abdulmejid, who had been away on his trip to Rumelia was interrupted suddenly, and had to return urgently to console his favorite who just had an "unhappy childbirth". 

A year later, on 27 November 1847, she gave birth to her third child, a daughter, Fatma Nazime Sultan in the Old Beylerbeyi Palace. The princess died five days later on 1 December 1847. A year later, on 23 May 1849, she gave birth to her fourth child, a son, Şehzade Mehmed Burhaneddin in the Old Beylerbeyi Palace.

Death
Nükhetsezâ died on 15 May 1850 of tuberculosis, and was buried in the mausoleum of the imperial ladies at the Yeni Mosque, Istanbul. After her death, her son Mehmed was adopted by Neverser Hanim, another consort of Abdülmejid who had no children.

Issue

In literature
Nükhetsezâ is a character in Hıfzı Topuz's historical novel Abdülmecit: İmparatorluk Çökerken Sarayda 22 Yıl: Roman (2009).

See also
Ikbal (title)
Ottoman Imperial Harem
List of consorts of the Ottoman sultans

References

Sources

1827 births
1850 deaths
19th-century people from the Ottoman Empire
Consorts of Abdulmejid I